The 2014–15 season is FK Čukarički´s 2nd straight season in Serbian SuperLiga. Because FK Crvena Zvezda violation of Financial Fair Play, FK čukarički received wildcard for UEFA Europa League. This article shows player statistics and all official matches that the club played during the 2014–15 season.

Players

Squad list

Top scorers
Includes all competitive matches. The list is sorted by shirt number when total goals are equal.

Players

In

Matches

Serbian SuperLiga

Serbian Cup

UEFA Europa League

External links

FK Čukarički
Cukaricki
Cukaricki